The Canaan River is located in the southeastern portion of New Brunswick. The river drains into Washademoak Lake, in turn draining into the Saint John River. The watershed is composed of 17 tributaries.

Communities along river
Canaan Station, New Brunswick
New Canaan, New Brunswick
Cherryvale, New Brunswick
Canaan Forks, New Brunswick
Phillipstown, New Brunswick
Brookvale, New Brunswick
Canaan Rapids, New Brunswick
Coles Island, New Brunswick
Chambres Corner, New Brunswick
Thometown, New Brunswick

River crossings
New Brunswick Route 112
New Brunswick Route 126
New Brunswick Route 2
New Brunswick Route 10
New Brunswick Route 715
New Brunswick Route 710

See also
List of rivers of New Brunswick

References

http://www.gnb.ca/0009/0371/0013/English/Canaan.pdf

Rivers of New Brunswick